The Château de Saint-Martin de Toques is a partly ruined, mountaintop castle in the Bizanet commune in the Aude département of southern France.

Construction of the castle dates to the 12th and 14th centuries. It was later owned by the Viscounts of Narbonne. In the sixteenth century, an Italian family took over the castle. At the beginning of the seventeenth century, it was converted into a farm property, but was abandoned and fell into ruin.

The castle is now privately owned and has been listed since 1926 as a monument historique by the French Ministry of Culture.

See also
List of castles in France

References

External links

 
 Le Château de Saint-Martin-de-Toques at the web site Au cœur des châteaux cathares

Castles in Aude
Châteaux in Aude
Monuments historiques of Aude